José María Salaverría e Ipenza (1873–1940) was a Spanish journalist and writer.

Biography 
Born on Vinaròs (province of Castellón) on 28 May 1873, he moved early in his life with his family to San Sebastián.

In his capacity as a journalist he wrote in several newspapers such as ABC (1908–1940), La Vanguardia (1914–1936) El Pueblo Vasco (1920–1936) or La Nación (1914–1940).

His distinctive conservative agnosticism was a rara avis among the Spanish right wing ranks. Salaverría received influences from Charles Maurras; those were reflected in La afirmación española, where Salaverría advocated for a traditionalist and anti-Europeanist brand of nationalism. While sometimes included in the Generation of '98, this labelling is found to be questionable by many. He was a prominent basher of most noventayochistas, directing a campaign against the likes of Joaquín Costa, Miguel de Unamuno and Ramiro de Maeztu, only saving Azorín and Ángel Ganivet from his criticism.

He was married to feminist Amalia Galárraga, and they had two daughters, Carmen and Margarita. The latter was Spain's first woman diplomat, serving as a plenipotentiary minister.

He died on 28 March 1940 in Madrid.

References

Bibliography

External links 
Works by José María Salaverría at Project Gutenberg

Spanish journalists
Spanish writers
Spanish nationalists
1873 births
1940 deaths